Industrialnyi District is an urban district of the city of Kharkiv, Ukraine, named after its industrial hub built in 1930s at its city's eastern outskirts. 

It was originally developed as a "socialist city" (sotsgorod) to house the workers of the newly built Kharkiv Tractor Plant (KhTZ). In 1936 the district was named Ordzhonikidzevskyi after Sergo Ordzhonikidze, Stalin's commissar for heavy industry.  

On 24 October 1941, after a four-day battle, Kharkiv and the district was occupied by German forces. In advance of the Germans, most the industrial plant, including the KhTZ, has been dismantled and moved east or rendered inoperative. On 14 December, the German Stadtkommandant ordered the Jewish population to be concentrated in a hut settlement near the KhTZ. In two days, 20,000 Jews were gathered there. Those an SS Sonderkommando did not shoot were killed throughout January in a gas van. The district and the city were liberated by Soviet forces in February 1943. The district was liberated again, following a German counteroffensive in March, in August 1943.

In February 2016 the district was renamed, Ordzhonikidzevskyi becoming the Industrialnyi District to comply with decommunization laws. The popular name for neighbourhood was, and has remained, "KhTZ", with a reputation of being the more socially deprived areas of the Kharkiv.

According to a Feb. 28, 2022, report from Agroportal24h, the Kharkiv Tractor Plant, was destroyed and “engulfed in fire” by “massive shelling” from Russian forces. There is video purporting to record explosions and fire at the plant on 25 and 27 February 2022.

On 4 March 2022, Human Rights Watch reported that on the fourth day of the invasion of Ukraine by the Russian Federation, 28 February 2022, Federation forces used cluster munitions in this, and two other districts, of Kharkiv. The rights group—which noted the "inherently indiscriminate nature of cluster munitions and their foreseeable effects on civilians"—based its assessment on interviews and an analyses of 40 videos and photographs.

Places
 KhTZ
 Chunykhy
 Obriy
 micro-districts: 759

Gallery

References

Urban districts of Kharkiv